National Highway 229 is a spur road of National Highway 29 in Nagaland, India. The highway starts from its junction with NH No-29 at Sub-Jail, Dimapur, connecting Thahekhu, Chümoukedima and terminating at its junction with NH No-29 in the state of Nagaland. It was declared as NH-229 on July 28, 2016. Length of the highway is 19 km.

References  

National highways in India
National Highways in Nagaland